Sandro Giacobbe (born  14 December 1949) is an Italian singer-songwriter.

Life and career 
Born in Genova in 1949, Giacobbe started his career in the early 1970s and got his first success in 1974, with the song "Signora mia", which entered the top-ten on the Italian hit parade. For about a decade, he got several major hits, usually consisting in romantic ballads characterized by intimate and sometimes malicious tones. His song ""El Jardín Prohibido", the Spanish-language version of "Il giardino proibito", peaked on first place at the Spanish hit parade in 1976. The same year, he entered the main competition at the Sanremo Music Festival, ranking third with the song "Gli occhi di tua madre"; the song reached the second place on the Italian hit parade. His last major hit was the 1982 song "Sarà la nostalgia". From the mid-1980s he mainly devoted his career to live concerts and to initiatives of solidarity. In 2003 he ranked second at the Viña del Mar International Song Festival.

Discography 
 Album  
  
     1974: Signora mia  
     1975: Il giardino proibito  
     1976: Metto all'asta...  
     1977: Bimba  
     1978: Lenti a contatto   
     1979: Mi va che ci sei   
     1980: Notte senza di te 
     1990: Io vorrei  
     1991: Sulla mia stessa strada  
     1992: Le donne  
     1994: E venti....  
     1998: Il meglio   
     2007: Vuoi ballare 
     2008: Trentacinque 
     2013: Insieme noi

References

External links 
 
 Sandro Giacobbe at Discogs

Musicians from Genoa
1951 births
Italian pop singers
Italian composers
Italian male composers
Italian singer-songwriters
Living people
Italian male singers
Spanish-language singers of Italy